Pearl Beach is an unincorporated community in St. Clair County in the U.S. state of Michigan.  Located in Clay Township, it is a census-designated place (CDP) used for statistical purposes. The population was 3,224 at the 2000 census.

Communities
Pearl Beach is at Pearl Beach Boulevard and M-29 (Elevation: 581 ft./177 m.)
Pointe aux Tremble is located in towards the center of the CDP area, east of Pearl Beach community on M-29 west of Island Drive. (Elevation: 577 ft./176 m.)

Geography
The CDP consists of a narrow strip along the north side of the North Channel of the St. Clair River from the western border of Algonac to the easternmost point of land where the North Channel flows into Anchor Bay. 
M-29 runs through the area, following the contour of the North Channel.

Demographics

As of the census of 2000, there were 3,224 people, 1,395 households, and 980 families residing in the community. The racial makeup of the community was 98.17% White, 0.40% Native American, 0.16% Asian, 0.34% from other races, and 0.93% from two or more races. Hispanic or Latino of any race were 0.62% of the population.

There were 1,395 households, out of which 20.1% had children under the age of 18 living with them, 62.9% were married couples living together, 4.3% had a female householder with no husband present, and 29.7% were non-families. 24.8% of all households were made up of individuals, and 11.1% had someone living alone who was 65 years of age or older.  The average household size was 2.31 and the average family size was 2.76.

In the community, the population was spread out, with 17.4% under the age of 18, 6.1% from 18 to 24, 23.9% from 25 to 44, 36.2% from 45 to 64, and 16.4% who were 65 years of age or older.  The median age was 46 years. For every 100 females, there were 106.4 males.  For every 100 females age 18 and over, there were 102.7 males.

The median income for a household in the community was $55,186, and the median income for a family was $68,583. Males had a median income of $58,542 versus $28,811 for females. The per capita income for the community was $32,320.  About 0.6% of families and 3.2% of the population were below the poverty line, including 2.9% of those under age 18 and 5.2% of those age 65 or over.

References

Unincorporated communities in St. Clair County, Michigan
Census-designated places in Michigan
Unincorporated communities in Michigan
Census-designated places in St. Clair County, Michigan
Michigan populated places on Lake St. Clair